Philip Gould, Baron Gould of Brookwood (30 March 1950 – 6 November 2011) was a British political consultant, and former advertising executive, who worked for the Labour Party.

Appointed by Director of Communications Peter Mandelson, he was strategy and polling adviser to the Labour Party in the general elections of 1987, 1992, 1997, 2001 and 2005. Involved in 'modernising' the party's image, Gould was particularly associated with Tony Blair and New Labour.

Early life and education
Gould grew up in Woking in a Jewish family, his father was a headmaster, but failed his 11-plus and went to a secondary modern school. Leaving school with only one O-level, he went on to study at East London College, based in Toynbee Hall, where he gained four A-levels. He subsequently won a place at the University of Sussex in 1971 to study politics, graduating in 1974.

Gould went to the London School of Economics (LSE) to study for an MSc in the history of political thought, where he was taught by the political scientist Michael Oakeshott. Later he returned to the LSE to teach a course in Modern Campaigning Politics.

Career
After a career in advertising, and with the success of his wife Gail Rebuck (later CEO of Random House UK), whom he had met at Sussex, Gould founded his own polling and strategy company, Philip Gould Associates, in 1985. Appointed by Mandelson, Gould recruited the Shadow Communications Agency, a team of communications volunteers who created Labour's unsuccessful 1987 election campaign. This led to his position of influence within the Labour Party under Neil Kinnock and Tony Blair.

In 1992, he planned the Sheffield Rally for the Labour Party, eight days before its loss of the 1992 general election.

Gould was the author of a leaked memo which, in 2000, described the New Labour brand as being contaminated.

On 7 June 2004 he was created a life peer taking the title Baron Gould of Brookwood, of Brookwood in the County of Surrey.

In 2007, he assumed a non-executive director role at Freud Communications, the firm of Blair's former diary secretary, Kate Garvey.

Illness

Preceding an interview with Andrew Marr on a Sunday morning BBC TV show, 18 September 2011, it was revealed that his treatment for three-times recurring cancer of the oesophagus had been unsuccessful. After being told by his doctor that he only had three months to live, Gould described himself as being in the "death zone":

Gould then turned his impending death into a campaign as a way of making his departure easier for his wife and daughters as well as helping others by writing and talking about facing up to death. His efforts resulted in an eight–minute film entitled, When I Die: Lessons from the Death Zone, a documentary of Gould's final weeks of life that was released on the video–sharing website YouTube before the release of his book by the same name.

Death
Gould died on 6 November 2011 at Royal Marsden Hospital, a specialist cancer treatment hospital in London.

It was stated that proceeds from his 2012 book, When I Die: Lessons from the Death Zone, would go to the National Oesophago–Gastric Cancer Fund and the Royal Marsden Cancer Charity. Before he died, Gould stated that he would be cremated and his urn interred at Highgate Cemetery.

Works
 Gould, Philip (1999). The Unfinished Revolution: How the Modernisers Saved the Labour Party Abacus, 
 Gould, Philip (2012). When I Die: Lessons from the Death Zone Little Brown,

Biography
Dennis Kavanagh (2012) Philip Gould: An Unfinished Life. Palgrave Macmillan.

Arms

References

External links

Documentary on Gould final weeks of life: 
Portrait photographed by Adrian Steirn. On display at National Gallery in London

1950 births
2011 deaths
Labour Party (UK) officials
Alumni of the London School of Economics
Alumni of the University of Sussex
Deaths from cancer in England
Labour Party (UK) life peers
Burials at Highgate Cemetery
People from Woking
Spouses of life peers
Life peers created by Elizabeth II